Martin Sidney Goldsmith (born 25 May 1962) is a Welsh former professional footballer who played as a forward.

Career
As a teenager, Goldsmith was working as a trainer hairdresser while playing amateur football for Carmarthen Town. After scoring seven goals in a Welsh Cup match, he attracted attention from several Football League sides before signing for Cambridge United. However, he struggled to establish himself in the first team, making 35 league appearances over four years before being released.

He joined Cardiff City in January 1984 where he made nine league appearances before moving into non-league football. After a spell with Merthyr Tydfil, he signed for Barry Town where he scored over 50 league goals in three seasons. He later played in the Welsh Premier League for Afan Lido.

References

1962 births
Living people
Welsh footballers
Carmarthen Town A.F.C. players
Cambridge United F.C. players
Cardiff City F.C. players
Merthyr Tydfil F.C. players
Barry Town United F.C. players
Afan Lido F.C. players
English Football League players
Cymru Premier players
Association football forwards